Big Island is a river island in Wood County, Wisconsin. The island is in the Wisconsin River near Wisconsin Rapids.

Big Island was so named on account of its size.

References

Landforms of Wood County, Wisconsin
River islands of Wisconsin